Lehman Springs is an unincorporated community in Umatilla County, Oregon, United States. Lehman Springs was named after pioneer James Lehman. Its post office was established on September 8, 1899, and it closed on February 29, 1928. Lehman Springs is now served by the Ukiah post office.

References

Unincorporated communities in Umatilla County, Oregon
Spa towns in Oregon
1899 establishments in Oregon
Populated places established in 1899
Unincorporated communities in Oregon